Mihailo Petrović (Gradac, Serbia, 30 June 1871 – Raška, Kingdom of Yugoslavia, 28 April 1941) was an early member of the Serbian Chetnik Organization and the Society of Saint Sava. He participated in the early Chetnik struggles to liberate Old Serbia from Ottoman, Albanian and Bulgarian treachery (1903–1912), the Balkan Wars (1912–1913) and the Great War (1914–1918).

Early life 
Petrović was born in the nearby village of Gradac, just outside of the town of Raška, in 1871. His mother died when he was a youngster and his father, a military man, was killed in the Serbo-Bulgarian War of 1885. As a 14-year-old he went to Belgrade to live with his uncle Stanojlo Petrović and aunt Draginja, who carefully tended to his education. Mihailo graduated from the First Belgrade Gymnasium and the School of Theology at the Seminary of Saint Sava, better known as Bogoslovija, part of Visoka škola (since 1905 University of Belgrade) in 1895. His professor was Archimandrite Firmilijan Drazic. That same year Mihailo married Leposava Obradinović, the daughter of Vujica Obradinović, a wealthy Belgrade industrialist, and then joined the priesthood in the ranks of a married man. He settled first at Ivanjica, where he had relatives. In 1900 he officiated the funerals of Mihailo Mihailović and Smiljana Mihailović (née Petrović), the parents of seven-year-old Dragoljub Mihailović. Then, he was transferred to a parish in Raška where he remained a priest until retirement.

In 1904 when King Peter I was crowned, Very Reverend Mihailo Petrović was an invited guest of the new king at the grand reception in Belgrade. During the Serbian uprising of 1904 in Old Serbia, the Balkan Wars (1912 and 1913), and the Great War, he served as a military pastor to the fighting men at the front lines. He started writing for the Glasnik (Herald) of the Serbian Orthodox Church as a regular contributor soon after becoming a priest. Among his colleagues at the time were Milan Rakić, Jovan Dučić, Nikolaj Velimirović, and other prominent Serbian men of letters, theologians, and diplomats.

Serbian Chetnik Organization 
He joined early the Serbian Chetnik Organization, formed to rid the Turk from the Balkans and consequently mainland Europe. Petrović was also a member of the Association of Reserve Officers and Warriors that commissioned a number of monuments to the fallen Chetnik fighters in the mid-1920s. It was an opportunity to praise the Chetnik leaders' effort for the liberation of Old Serbia and to criticize the post-war neglect of Serbian war veterans, to attack those who too easily forgot the great sufferings the Serbian people in their plight for emancipation.

The first reliable data about early Chetnik activity came with the fall of Communism in the 1990s, written by Vladan Virijević, a professor from Kosovo-Metohija, who mentions archpriest Mihailo Petrović "as an old warrior" who came to bless Chetnik standards, banners and flags in villages and towns throughout Raška in 1937 at a time of the Concordat crisis in Yugoslavia.

Archpriest Petrović was Bishop of Žiča Nikolaj Velimirović's deputy (arhijerejski namesnik/Bishop's Dean) for the Studenica district with its seat in Raška from 1919-1920 and later from 1936-1941. He also held the same post (bishop's dean) during the time of Bishop Jefrem Bojović (1920-1933). As a contributing editor to the Glasnik (Herald) of the Serbian Patriarchate of Belgrade, Petrović often emphasized in his articles the continued security threats Serbs faced in the region, writing about the need to organize armed or paramilitary defences against those national threats. Petrović was calling for a continued role for the Chetniks in the southern regions of Serbia through the 1930s, if not before.

See also
 List of Chetnik voivodes

References 

Chetniks
1871 births
1941 deaths
People from Raška District